Terence Ronald Vaughan (born 22 April 1938) is a Welsh former professional footballer who played in the Football League for Mansfield Town.

References

1938 births
Living people
Welsh footballers
Association football forwards
English Football League players
Mansfield Town F.C. players